(born January 31, 1910, date of death unknown) was a Japanese field hockey player who competed in the 1932 Summer Olympics. In 1932 he was a member of the Japanese field hockey team, which won the silver medal. He played two matches as forward. He was born in Hiroshima Prefecture, Japan.

External links
 
Junzo Inohara's profile at databaseOlympics.com
Junzo Inohara's profile at Sports Reference.com

1910 births
Year of death missing
Sportspeople from Hiroshima Prefecture
Japanese male field hockey players
Olympic field hockey players of Japan
Field hockey players at the 1932 Summer Olympics
Olympic silver medalists for Japan
Olympic medalists in field hockey
Medalists at the 1932 Summer Olympics
20th-century Japanese people